The four Tornado class locomotives were  broad gauge locomotives operated on the South Devon Railway and associated railways.  They were designed for goods trains but were also used on passenger trains when required.

They were ordered by Evans and Geach who were contracted to operate the railway's locomotives. They were designed by Daniel Gooch and based on his Banking Class locomotives built for the Great Western Railway who had previously operated the South Devon Railway, and built by the Vulcan Foundry.

On 1 February 1876 the South Devon Railway was amalgamated with the Great Western Railway, the locomotives were given numbers by their new owners but continued to carry their names too.

Three similar locomotives were built for the Vale of Neath Railway in 1854. Some of these could be found working on the South Devon lines after the 1876 amalgamation.

Locomotives 
 Goliah (1855 – 1885) GWR no. 2141
This locomotive was named after a biblical character, Goliath.

 Sampson (1855 – 1884) GWR no. 2142
This locomotive was named after Samson, a biblical character associated with Goliath.

 Tornado (1854 – 1884) GWR no. 2139
On 13 March 1860 Tornado was working a goods train at Totnes when its boiler exploded, killing the driver. It was also notorious for being the locomotive of a runaway china clay train at Burngullow on the Cornwall Railway on 29 October 1872.
A tornado is a kind of wind.

 Volcano (1854 – 1877) GWR no. 2140
A volcano is a mountain that erupts magma.

References 
 
 
 
 
 
 Railway company records at The National Archives

Broad gauge (7 feet) railway locomotives
0-6-0ST locomotives
Vulcan Foundry locomotives
Tornado
Railway locomotives introduced in 1854